Cedar Bridge refers to three different bridges in Madison County, in the U.S. state of Iowa. The original Cedar Covered Bridge was built in 1883, moved in 1921, and was named to the National Register of Historic Places in 1976. The bridge was filmed in the 1995 movie The Bridges of Madison County, and destroyed by arson in 2002. The second covered Cedar Bridge was built in 2004. This second bridge was destroyed by arsonists in 2017. The bridge was again rebuilt in 2019.

The original Cedar Covered Bridge
Cedar Covered Bridge was built in 1883 by Harvey P. Jones at a location north of Winterset over Cedar Creek which is now U.S. 169. The bridge was moved in 1921 to the current location over Cedar Creek. A picture of this bridge is on the cover of the novel The Bridges of Madison County. It was renovated in 1998. It was named to the National Register of Historic Places in 1976.

This bridge was destroyed by arson on September 3, 2002. It was taken off the National Register of Historic Places on October 18, 2002.

New Cedar Covered Bridge
A replacement bridge was built to the same plans and specifications as the original and using authentic materials and techniques. It reopened during October, 2004. On April 15, 2017, the new bridge was again destroyed by fire. As of April 19, 2017, Joel Davis, 18, of Norwalk, and Alexander Hoff, 17, of West Des Moines, were both arrested and charged with first-degree arson. The 17-year-old will be tried as an adult. A third person, Alivia Marie Bergmann, 19, of Des Moines, was arrested and charged with second-degree arson in May 2017.

In April 2018 Joel Davis was sentenced to 5 years' probation, a $1,000 fine, court costs, and restitution for the burned bridge. Alexander Hoff received five years of probation and a suspended 10-year prison sentence. Alivia Bergmann plead guilty to second-degree arson, and was sentenced to 5 years' probation, and bridge restitution.

The city again rebuilt the bridge and reopened it during the annual "Covered Bridge Festival" in October 2019.

See also
List of covered bridges in Madison County, Iowa

References

External links

Bridges completed in 1883
Covered bridges in Iowa
Wooden bridges in Iowa
Tourist attractions in Madison County, Iowa
Bridges in Madison County, Iowa
Road bridges in Iowa
Bridges completed in 2004
Former National Register of Historic Places in Iowa
Covered bridges in the United States destroyed by arson